Nickolas Butler is an American novelist and short story author. He is the author of four novels: Shotgun Lovesongs (2014), The Hearts of Men (2017), Little Faith (2019), and Godspeed (2021). He also authored the short story collection Beneath the Bonfire (2015).

Biography
Butler was born in Allentown, Pennsylvania. He was raised in Eau Claire, Wisconsin, where he attended Memorial High School. He attended high school alongside Justin Vernon, frontman of indie folk band Bon Iver. Butler's debut novel Shotgun Lovesongs (2014) was partly inspired by the creation of Bon Iver's debut album For Emma, Forever Ago (2007). Butler graduated with a bachelor's degree in English from the University of Wisconsin–Madison in 2002, and received an MFA from the Iowa Writers' Workshop in 2012. Prior to publishing Shotgun Lovesongs, Butler worked in coffee roasting, office management, meat packing, telemarketing, maintenance at Burger King, and as an author escort, liquor store clerk, hot-dog vendor, and bed-and-breakfast manager.

Butler has received literary prizes for his work and has published articles, reviews, short stories, and poetry in publications including Ploughshares, Narrative Magazine, and The New York Times Book Review, The Kenyon Review Online, The Christian Science Monitor, and Sixth Finch. Butler's debut novel, Shotgun Lovesongs (2014), was published to critical acclaim, including a review by Janet Maslin in The New York Times and a review by Jonathan Evison in The New York Times Book Review. In March 2013, Deadline Hollywood reported that Fox Searchlight Pictures acquired the film rights to Shotgun Lovesongs.

Butler is also a contributor to a local Wisconsin newspaper, The Country Today, where he shares stories and observations about life and events in western Wisconsin.

Butler lives with his wife and two children in rural Wisconsin.

Awards and honors
 2018 Friends of American Writers Literary Award
 2016 Prix Médicis étranger, shortlist
 2015 Wisconsin Library Association Literary Award
2015 UW–Whitewater Chancellor's Regional Literary Award
2014 Prix PAGE/America
2014 Great Lakes Great Reads Award
2014 Midwest Independent Booksellers Award
 2014 Flaherty-Dunnan First Novel Prize, longlist
 2014 Prix du roman Fnac, shortlist
 First Place in Narrative Magazines Spring 2011 Story Contest for "Underneath the Bonfire"

Bibliography

Novels

Short story collections
 
 "The Chainsaw Soirée"
 "Rainwater"
 "Sven & Lily"
 "Morels"
 "Leftovers"
 "Beneath the Bonfire"
 "Sweet Light Crude"
 "In Western Counties"
 "Train People Move Slow"
 "Apples"

Short stories

Poetry

Nonfiction

References

1979 births
Living people
Date of birth missing (living people)
21st-century American novelists
American male novelists
21st-century American poets
American male poets
21st-century American short story writers
American male short story writers
People from Eau Claire, Wisconsin
Writers from Allentown, Pennsylvania
Writers from Wisconsin
University of Wisconsin–Madison College of Letters and Science alumni
Iowa Writers' Workshop alumni
21st-century American male writers